Kadlikoppa is a village in Belagavi in Ramdurg Karnataka, India. Kadlikoppa has a population of 1,864 people.

References

Villages in Haveri district